The Supreme Court of India was in crisis after a press conference was given by Supreme Court judges Jasti Chelameswar, Ranjan Gogoi, Madan Lokur, and Kurian Joseph, in which they spoke against the Chief Justice of India Dipak Misra that he allocated certain politically controversial cases to such benches which gives favourable judgements towards a political party.

The judges mentioned the allocation of the case of investigation of death of Special CBI Judge — BH Loya, who was presiding over Sohrabuddin encounter case, in which the BJP President Amit Shah and Rohith Shah was the prime accused.

Background
On 12 January 2018, four Supreme Court judges Jasti Chelameswar, Ranjan Gogoi, Madan Lokur and Kurian Joseph gave a press meeting in an unprecedented manner. Chelameswar said, “We tried to collectively persuade the chief justice that certain things are not in order and therefore you should take remedial measures....Unfortunately, our efforts failed.” He also said, “that unless this institution is preserved and it maintains its equanimity, democracy will not survive in this country.”  The occurred after Misra headed the bench which dismissed the CJAR petition against him, and after the Justice Loya case had attracted scrutiny. The allegations against Misra were related to the allotment of matters to benches and constituting Constitution Benches  in a way that arbitrarily ignored Senior Judges of the Court. That important cases were heard by benches headed by Dipak Misra. The judges claimed to have a written a letter to Dipak Misra for which they had not received a reply. After the press conference, Misra created a new judicial roster which excluded those who spoke against him from all constitution benches.

Proposed impeachment of the Chief Justice of India
On 20 April 2018, seven opposition parties submitted a petition seeking impeachment of Dipak Misra to the Vice President Venkaiah Naidu, with signatures from 71 parliamentarians.

References

External links
Full text of letter: Four senior judges say situation in SC 'not in order'

Supreme Court of India
India